Denali is the debut album of the American rock band Denali.

Track listing
"French Mistake"
"You File"
"Lose Me"
"Everybody Knows"
"Prozac"
"Relief"
"Time Away"
"Gunner"
"Function"
"Where I Landed"

Personnel 
Maura Davis: vocals, piano, rhodes piano, guitar
Keeley Davis: bass, guitar, synth, vocals, samples, organ
Cam DiNunzio: guitars, synth, samples, MIDI orchestra, organ
Johnathan Fuller: drums, sequencer, samples (tracks 1-6, 8, 10)
Mark Linkous: MIDI orchestra, synth, samples, bass drum (tracks 6-7)

References

2002 albums
Denali (band) albums
Jade Tree (record label) albums